Worcester is a city in and the seat of Worcester County, Massachusetts, United States. Named after Worcester, England, the city's population was 206,518 at the 2020 census, making it the second-most populous city in New England after Boston. Due to its location near the geographic center of Massachusetts, Worcester is known as the "Heart of the Commonwealth"; a heart is the official symbol of the city.

Worcester developed as an industrial city in the 19th century due to the Blackstone Canal and rail transport, producing machinery, textiles and wire. Large numbers of European immigrants made up the city's growing population. However, the city's manufacturing base waned following World War II. Long-term economic and population decline was not reversed until the 1990s, when higher education, medicine, biotechnology, and new immigrants started to make their mark. The city's population has grown by 28% since 1980, reaching a new all-time high in the 2020 census and experiencing urban renewal.

Modern Worcester is known for its diversity and large immigrant population, with significant communities of Vietnamese, Brazilians, Albanians, Puerto Ricans, Ghanaians, Dominicans, and others. Twenty-two percent of Worcester's population was born outside the United States. A center of higher education, it is home to eight separate colleges and universities, including Holy Cross, Worcester Polytechnic Institute (WPI), and Clark University. Architecturally, Worcester is notable for its large number of 19th century triple-decker houses, Victorian-era mill architecture, and lunch car diners such as Miss Worcester.

Worcester is the principal city of Central Massachusetts, and is a regional government, employment and transportation hub. Since the 1970s, and especially after the construction of Route 146 and interstates 90, 495, 190, 290, and 395, both Worcester and its surrounding towns have become increasingly integrated with Boston's suburbs. The Worcester region now marks the western periphery of the Boston-Worcester-Providence (MA-RI-NH) U.S. Census Combined Statistical Area (CSA), or Greater Boston.

History

Colonial era 

The area was first inhabited by members of the Nipmuc tribe. The native people called the region Quinsigamond and built a settlement on Pakachoag Hill in Auburn.  

In 1673, English settlers John Eliot and Daniel Gookin led an expedition to Quinsigamond to establish a new Christian Indian "praying town" and identify a new location for an English settlement. On July 13, 1674, Gookin obtained a deed to eight square miles of land in Quinsigamond from the Nipmuc people and English traders and settlers began to inhabit the region.

In 1675, King Philip's War broke out throughout New England with the Nipmuc Indians coming to the aid of Indian leader King Philip. The English settlers completely abandoned the Quinsigamond area and the empty buildings were burned by the Indian forces. The town was again abandoned during Queen Anne's War in 1702.   

Finally, in 1713, Worcester was permanently resettled for a third and final time by Jonas Rice.  Named after the city of Worcester, England, the town was incorporated on June 14, 1722.  

On April 2, 1731, Worcester was chosen as the county seat of the newly founded Worcester County government. Between 1755 and 1758, future U.S. president John Adams worked as a schoolteacher and studied law in Worcester.

Growth and industry 

In the 1770s, Worcester became a center of American revolutionary activity. British General Thomas Gage was given information of patriot ammunition stockpiled in Worcester in 1775. That same year, Massachusetts Spy publisher Isaiah Thomas moved his radical newspaper out of British occupied Boston to Worcester. Thomas would continuously publish his paper throughout the American Revolutionary War. On July 14, 1776, Thomas performed the first public reading in Massachusetts of the Declaration of Independence from the porch of the Old South Church, where the 19th-century Worcester City Hall stands today. He would later go on to form the American Antiquarian Society in Worcester in 1812.
 
During the turn of the 19th century Worcester's economy moved into manufacturing. Factories producing textiles, shoes and clothing opened along the nearby Blackstone River. 

However, the manufacturing industry in Worcester would not begin to thrive until the opening of the Blackstone Canal in 1828 and the opening of the Worcester and Boston Railroad in 1835. The city transformed into a transportation hub and the manufacturing industry flourished.   

Worcester was officially chartered as a city on February 29, 1848. The city's industries soon attracted immigrants of primarily Irish, Scottish, French, German, and Swedish descent in the mid-19th century and later many immigrants of Lithuanian, Polish, Italian, Greek, Turkish and Armenian descent.  Immigrants moved into new three-decker houses (which originated in Worcester)  lining hundreds of Worcester's expanding streets and neighborhoods.

In 1831, Ichabod Washburn opened the Washburn & Moen Company. The company would become the largest wire manufacturing in the country and Washburn became one of the leading industrial and philanthropic figures in the city.

Worcester would become a center of machinery, wire products and power looms and boasted large manufacturers, including Washburn & Moen, Wyman-Gordon Company, American Steel & Wire, Morgan Construction and the Norton Company. In 1908, the Royal Worcester Corset Company was the largest employer of women in the United States.

Worcester would also claim many inventions and firsts. New England Candlepin bowling was invented in Worcester by Justin White in 1879. Esther Howland began the first line of Valentine's Day cards from her Worcester home in 1847. Loring Coes invented the first monkey wrench and Russell Hawes created the first envelope folding machine. On June 12, 1880, Lee Richmond pitched the first perfect game in Major league baseball history for the Worcester Ruby Legs at the Worcester Agricultural Fairgrounds. The first three-decker homes were built by Francis Gallagher (1830–1911) in Worcester.

Urban changes and recovery 

After World War II, Worcester began to fall into decline as the city lost its manufacturing base to cheaper alternatives across the country and overseas. Worcester felt the national trends of movement away from historic urban centers. The city's population dropped over 20% from 1950 to 1980. In the mid-20th century large urban renewal projects were undertaken to try to reverse the city's decline. A huge area of downtown Worcester was demolished for new office towers and the  Worcester Center Galleria shopping mall. After only 30 years the Galleria would lose most of its major tenants and its appeal to more suburban shopping malls around Worcester County.

On June 9, 1953, an F4 tornado touched down in Petersham, Massachusetts, northwest of Worcester. The tornado tore through  of Worcester County including a large area of the city of Worcester. The tornado left massive destruction and killed 94 people. The Worcester tornado would be the deadliest tornado ever to hit Massachusetts.  Debris from the tornado landed as far away as Dedham, Massachusetts. In the 1960s, Interstate 290 was built right through the center of Worcester, permanently dividing the city. In 1963, Worcester native Harvey Ball introduced the iconic yellow smiley face to American culture.

In the late 20th century, Worcester's economy began to recover as the city expanded into biotechnology and healthcare fields. The UMass Medical School has become a leader in biomedical research and the Massachusetts Biotechnology Research Park has become a center of medical research and development.  Worcester hospitals Saint Vincent Hospital and UMass Memorial Health Care have become two of the largest employers in the city. Worcester's many colleges, including the College of the Holy Cross, Worcester Polytechnic Institute, Clark University, UMass Medical School, Assumption University, MCPHS University, and Worcester State University, attract many students to the area and help drive the new economy.

On December 3, 1999, a homeless couple accidentally started a five-alarm fire at the Worcester Cold Storage & Warehouse Company. The fire took the lives of six firemen and drew national attention as one of the worst firefighting tragedies of the late 20th century. President Bill Clinton, Vice President Al Gore and other local and national dignitaries attended the funeral service and memorial program in Worcester.

Recent investment and growth 
In recent decades, a renewed interest in the city's downtown has brought new investment and construction to Worcester. A Convention Center was built along the DCU Center arena in downtown Worcester in 1997.  

In 2000, Worcester's Union Station reopened after 25 years of neglect and a $32 million renovation. Hanover Insurance helped fund a multimillion-dollar renovation to the old Franklin Square Theater into the Hanover Theatre for the Performing Arts.  

In 2000, the Massachusetts College of Pharmacy and Health Sciences built a new campus in downtown Worcester. In 2007, WPI opened the first facility in their new Gateway Park center in Lincoln Square.  

In 2004, Berkeley Investments proposed demolishing the old Worcester Center Galleria for a new mixed-used development called City Square. The ambitious project looked to reconnect old street patterns while creating a new retail, commercial and living destination in the city.  After struggling to secure finances for a number of years, Hanover Insurance took over the project and demolition began on September 13, 2010. Unum Insurance and the Saint Vincent Hospital leased into the project and both facilities opened in 2013. The new Front Street opened on December 31, 2012. 

In July 2017, Massachusetts Lieutenant Governor Karyn Polito and other Baker administration transportation officials visited a construction project in the city to highlight $2.8 billion spent during Baker's administration on highway construction projects and improvements to bridges, intersections, and sidewalks.

Worcester has become home to many refugees in recent years. The city has successfully resettled over 2,000 refugees coming from over 24 countries. Today, most of these refugees come from the Democratic Republic of the Congo, Iraq, Somalia, Bhutan, Syria, Ukraine and Afghanistan.

Geography

Worcester is bordered by the towns of Auburn, Grafton, Holden, Leicester, Millbury, Paxton, Shrewsbury, and West Boylston.

Worcester is known as the "Heart of the Commonwealth" because of its proximity to the center of Massachusetts.

The Blackstone River forms in the center of Worcester by the confluence of the Middle River and Mill Brook. The river courses underground through the center of the city, and emerges at the foot of College Hill. It then flows south through Quinsigamond Village and into Millbury. Worcester is the beginning of the Blackstone Valley that frames the river. The Blackstone Canal was once an important waterway connecting Worcester to Providence and the Eastern Seaboard, but the canal fell into disuse at the end of the 19th century and was mostly covered up. In recent years, local organizations, including the Canal District Business Association, have proposed restoring the canal and creating a Blackstone Valley National Park.  

In November 2018, the administration of Massachusetts Governor Charlie Baker announced a $400,000 grant to streetscape improvements in the Canal District.

Worcester is one of many cities claimed, like Rome, to be found on seven hills: Airport Hill, Bancroft Hill, Belmont Hill (Bell Hill), Grafton Hill, Green Hill, Pakachoag Hill and Vernon Hill. However, Worcester has more than seven hills, examples of which include Indian Hill, Newton Hill, Poet's Hill, and Wigwam Hill.

Worcester has many ponds and two prominent lakes: Indian Lake and Lake Quinsigamond.

Climate
Worcester's humid continental climate (Köppen: Dfb) is typical of New England. The weather changes rapidly owing to the confluence of warm, humid air from the southwest; cool, dry air from the north; and the moderating influence of the Atlantic Ocean to the east. Summers are typically hot and humid, while winters are cold, windy, and snowy. Snow typically falls from the second half of November into early April, with occasional falls in October; May snow is much rarer. The USDA classifies the city as straddling hardiness zones 5b and 6a.

Worcester is known for being particularly snowy in the cold months, sometimes even experiencing autumn blizzards. Massachusetts' geographic location, jutting out into the North Atlantic, as well as Worcester's elevation relative to the surrounding terrain, makes the city very prone to Nor'easter weather systems that can dump heavy snow on the region. In late January 2015, a blizzard traversed over the city as it shed almost  of snow. This was the highest single-day snowfall total for anywhere in Massachusetts since data collection began in 1892.

While rare, the city has had its share of extreme weather. On September 21, 1938, the city was hit by the brutal New England Hurricane of 1938. Fifteen years later, Worcester was hit by a tornado that killed 94 people. The deadliest tornado in New England history, it damaged a large part of the city and surrounding towns. It struck Assumption Preparatory School, now the site of Quinsigamond Community College.

Neighborhoods

Gallery

Demographics

According to the 2020 U.S. Census, Worcester had a population of 206,518, of which 104,911 (50.8%) were female and 101,607 (49.2%) were male. In terms of age, 81.0% were over 18 years old and 13.6% were over 65 years old; children under 5 made up 5.2% of the city's population.

In terms of race and ethnicity, Worcester's population as of 2020 was 67.7% White (including Hispanics), 13.0% Black or African American, 0.5% American Indian and Alaska Native, 7.2% Asian, <0.1% Native Hawaiian and Other Pacific Islander, 5.2% from Some Other Race, and 6.4% from Two or More Races. Hispanics and Latinos of any race made up 23.1% of the population (of whom nearly half were Puerto Rican). Non-Hispanic Whites were 54.4% of the population in 2020, down from 96.8% in 1970. 19.7% of Worcester's population are below the poverty threshold.

Worcester is known for its diversity and large immigrant population, with significant communities of Vietnamese, Brazilians, Albanians, Puerto Ricans, Ghanaians, Dominicans, and others. 22% of Worcester's population was born outside the United States in 2018.

Income

Data is from the 2015–2019 American Community Survey 5-Year Estimates.

Government

Worcester is governed by a council–manager government, with a popularly elected mayor. A city council acts as the legislative body, and the council-appointed manager handles the traditional day-to-day chief executive functions.

City councilors can run as either a representative of a city district or as an at-large candidate. The winning at-large candidate who receives the greatest number of votes for mayor becomes the mayor (at-large councilor candidates must ask to be removed from the ballot for mayor if they do not want to be listed on the mayoral ballot). As a result, voters must vote for their mayoral candidate twice, once as an at-large councilor, and once as the mayor. The mayor has no more authority than other city councilors, but is the ceremonial head of the city and chair of the city council and school committee. Currently, there are 11 councilors: 6 at-large and 5 district.

Worcester's first charter, which went into effect in 1848, established a Mayor/Bicameral form of government. Together, the two chambers—the 11-member Board of Aldermen and the 30-member Common Council—were vested with complete legislative powers. The mayor handled all administrative departments, though appointments to those departments had to be approved by the two-chamber City Council.

Seeking to replace the 1848 charter, Worcester voters in November 1947 approved a change to Plan E municipal government. In effect from January 1949 until November 1985, this charter (as outlined in chapter 43 of the Massachusetts General Laws) established City Council/City Manager government. This type of governance, with modifications, has survived to the present day.

Initially, Plan E government in Worcester was organized as a 9-member council (all at-large), a ceremonial mayor elected from the council by the councilors, and a council-appointed city manager. The manager oversees the daily administration of the city, makes all appointments to city offices, and can be removed at any time by a majority vote of the council. The mayor chairs the city council and the school committee, and does not have the power to veto any vote.

From 1949 through 1959, elections were by the single transferable vote. Voters repealed that system in November 1960. Despite non-partisan elections, two groups alternated in control of council: the local Democratic Party and a slate known as the Citizens' Plan E Association (CEA). CEA members included the Republican Party leadership and other groups not affiliated with the regular Democratic Party.

In 1983, Worcester voters again decided to change the city charter. This "Home Rule" charter (named for the method of adoption of the charter) is similar to Plan E, the major changes being to the structure of the council and the election of the mayor. The 9-member Council became 11, 6 at-large and 1 from each city district. The mayor is chosen by popular election, but must also run and win as an at-large councilor.

Politics

Worcester's history of social progressivism includes a number of temperance and abolitionist movements. It was a leader in the women's suffrage movement: The first national convention advocating women's rights was held in Worcester on October 23–24, 1850.

Two of the nation's most radical abolitionists, Abby Kelley Foster and her husband Stephen S. Foster, adopted Worcester as their home, as did Thomas Wentworth Higginson, the editor of The Atlantic Monthly and Emily Dickinson's avuncular correspondent, and Unitarian minister Rev. Edward Everett Hale.

The area was already home to Lucy Stone, Eli Thayer, and Samuel May Jr. They were joined in their political activities by networks of related Quaker families such as the Earles and the Chases, whose organizing efforts were crucial to the anti-slavery cause in central Massachusetts and throughout New England.

Anarchist Emma Goldman and two others opened an ice cream shop in 1892. "It was spring and not yet warm," Goldman later wrote, "but the coffee I brewed, our sandwiches, and dainty dishes were beginning to be appreciated. Within a short time, we were able to invest in a soda-water fountain and some lovely colored dishes."

On October 19, 1924, the largest gathering of the Ku Klux Klan (KKK) ever held in New England took place at the Agricultural Fairgrounds in Worcester. Klansmen in sheets and hoods, new Knights awaiting a mass induction ceremony, and supporters swelled the crowd to 15,000. The KKK had hired more than 400 "husky guards", but when the rally ended around midnight, a riot broke out. Klansmen's cars were stoned and burned, and their windows smashed. KKK members were pulled from their cars and beaten. Klansmen called for police protection, but the situation raged out of control for most of the night. The violence after the "Klanvocation" had the desired effect: Membership fell off, and no further public Klan meetings were held in Worcester.

Robert Stoddard, owner of The Telegram and Gazette, was one of the founders of the John Birch Society.

Sixties era radical Abbie Hoffman was born in Worcester in 1936 and spent more than half of his life in the city.

Public safety

For public safety needs, the City of Worcester is protected by both the Worcester Fire Department and the Worcester Police Department.

UMass Memorial Medical Center provides emergency medical services (EMS) under contract with the city. Originally operated by Worcester City Hospital and later by the University of Massachusetts Medical School, "Worcester EMS" operates exclusively at the advanced life support (ALS) level, with two paramedics staffing each ambulance. UMass Memorial EMS maintains two community EMS stations and operates a fleet of 18 ambulances (including spares), as well as a special-operations trailer, several other support vehicles, and a bike team; the agency responds to an average of 100 emergencies each day. UMass Memorial EMS operates the EMS Communications Center, which is a secondary PSAP and provides emergency medical dispatch (EMD) services to Worcester and other communities.

Economy
By the mid-19th century Worcester was one of New England's largest manufacturing centers. The city's large industries specialized in machinery, wire production, and power looms. Although manufacturing has declined, the city still maintains large manufactures, like Norton Abrasives, which was bought by Saint-Gobain in 1990, Morgan Construction Company, since bought by Siemens and then bought by Japanese company PriMetals Technologies, and the David Clark Company. The David Clark Company pioneered aeronautical equipment including anti-gravity suits and noise attenuating headsets.

Services, particularly education and healthcare, make up a large portion of the city's economy. Worcester's many colleges and universities make higher education a considerable presence in the city's economy.
Hanover Insurance was founded in 1852 and retains its headquarters in Worcester. Unum Insurance and Fallon Community Health Plan have offices in the city. Polar Beverages is the largest independent soft-drink bottler in the country and is in Worcester.

Worcester is home to the largest concentration of digital gaming students in the United States. The Memorial Auditorium, built as a tribute to World War I veterans of Worcester, is undergoing a renovation and may cater to these Digital Students as a future multimedia and digital center, in conjunction with the twelve Worcester colleges and universities.

As one of the top ten emerging hubs for tech startups, the city's biotechnology and technology industries have helped spur major expansions at both the University of Massachusetts Medical School and Worcester Polytechnic Institute. The Massachusetts Biotechnology Research Park hosts many innovative companies including Advanced Cell Technology and AbbVie. The Worcester Foundation for Experimental Biology in nearby Shrewsbury developed the oral contraceptive pill in 1951.

Downtown Worcester used to boast major Boston retailers Filene's and Jordan Marsh as well Worcester's own department stores Barnard's and Denholm & McKay. Over time most retailers moved away from downtown and into the suburban Auburn Mall and Greendale Mall in North Worcester.

In 2010, the median household income was $61,212. Median family income was $76,485. The per capita income was $29,316. About 7.7% of families and 10.8% of the population were below the poverty line, including 14.1% of those under age 18 and 7.5% of those age 65 or over. In October 2013, Worcester was found to be the number five city for investing in a rental property.

In November 2016, the administration of Massachusetts Governor Charlie Baker announced a $2.3 million grant to the city to redevelop its downtown area for greater walkability. In January 2017, Baker signed into law a bill allowing 44 acres of unused state-owned land on the former Worcester State Hospital campus to be converted into a biomanufacturing industrial park. In November 2017, Baker's administration and the Worcester Business Development Corporation signed a land disposition agreement for the park.

Top employers
According to the city's 2018 Comprehensive Annual Financial Report, the top ten employers in the city are:

Education

Primary and secondary education
Worcester Public Schools educate more than 25,000 students in pre-kindergarten through 12th grade. The system consists of 34 elementary schools, 4 middle schools, 8 high schools, and several other learning centers such as magnet schools, alternative schools, and special education schools. The city's public school system also administers an adult education component called "Night Life", and operates a Public-access television cable TV station on channel 11. In June 2015, Massachusetts Governor Charlie Baker announced a $1.3 million grant to the Elm Park Community School.

Worcester Technical High School opened in 2006, replacing the old Worcester Vocational High School, or "Voke". The city's other public high schools include South High Community School, North High School, Doherty Memorial High School, Burncoat Senior High School, University Park Campus School, and Claremont Academy.

In 2014, Worcester Tech's graduating class was honored by having President Barack Obama as the speaker at their graduation ceremony.

The Massachusetts Academy of Math and Science was founded in 1992 as a public secondary school at the Worcester Polytechnic Institute.

One notable charter school in the city is Abby Kelley Foster Charter Public School, which teaches kindergarten through 12th grade. It is granted status by Massachusetts as a Level 1 school.  It is the one of 834 schools in the United States to offer the International Baccalaureate Diploma Programme.

Twenty-one private and parochial schools are also found throughout Worcester, including the city's oldest educational institution, Worcester Academy, founded in 1834, and Bancroft School, founded in 1900.

Higher education

Worcester is currently home to eight colleges and universities.
 Assumption University is the fourth oldest Roman Catholic college in New England and was founded in 1904. At , it has the largest campus in Worcester.
 Clark University was founded in 1887 as the first all-graduate school in the country; it now also educates undergraduates and is noted for its strengths in psychology and geography. Its first president was G. Stanley Hall, the founder of organized psychology as a science and profession, father of the child study movement, and founder of the American Psychological Association. Well-known professors include Albert A. Michelson, who won the first American Nobel Prize in 1902 for his measurement of light. Robert H. Goddard, a pioneering rocket scientist of the space age also studied and taught here, and, in his only visit to the United States, Sigmund Freud delivered his five famous "Clark Lectures" at the university. Clark offers one of only two programs leading to a Ph.D. in Holocaust and Genocide Studies, the other is offered by Gratz College.
 College of the Holy Cross was founded in 1843 and is the oldest Roman Catholic college in New England and one of the oldest in the United States. Well-known graduates include Dr. Anthony Fauci, Director of the National Institute of Allergy and Infectious Diseases, Nobel laureate Joseph E. Murray; former Poet Laureate of the United States Billy Collins; Basketball Hall of Fame member Bob Cousy; attorney and professional sports' team owner Edward Bennett Williams; College Football Hall of Fame member Gordie Lockbaum; and Supreme Court Justice Clarence Thomas. In 2013, Holy Cross was ranked by U.S. News & World Report as the nation's 25th highest-rated liberal arts college.
 The Massachusetts College of Pharmacy and Health Sciences Worcester Campus houses the institution's Doctor of Optometry program, accelerated Doctor of Pharmacy, Post-Baccalaureate Bachelor's in Nursing; Master's in Nursing – Family Nurse Practitioner, Master's program New England School of Acupuncture, as well as the Master's program in Physician Assistant Studies for post-baccalaureate students.
 Quinsigamond Community College was founded in 1963 and provides associate degree and professional certificate options to its 13,000 students per year. In addition to its main campus, students train and study at multiple program sites throughout Worcester as well as one in Marlborough and one in Southbridge.
 The University of Massachusetts Medical School (1970) is one of the nation's top 50 medical schools. Dr. Craig Mello won the 2006 Nobel Prize for Medicine. The University of Massachusetts Medical School is ranked fourth in primary care education among America's 125 medical schools in the 2006 U.S. News & World Report annual guide "America's Best Graduate Schools".
 Worcester Polytechnic Institute (WPI) is a private research university, focusing on the instruction and research of technical arts and applied sciences. Founded in 1865, WPI was one of the United States' first engineering and technology universities and now has 14 academic departments with over 50 undergraduate and graduate degree programs in science, engineering, technology, management, the social sciences, and the humanities and arts. Robert Goddard, the father of modern rocketry, graduated from WPI in 1908 with a Bachelor of Science in physics.
 Worcester State University (WSU) is a public liberal arts and sciences university located on the city's west side. Founded in 1874 as the State Normal School at Worcester, it was the fifth of nine public teacher training colleges in the commonwealth. Today WSU offers 34 undergraduate majors and 30 graduate programs and includes a student body of 6400.

Many of these institutions participate in the Colleges of Worcester Consortium. This independent, non-profit collegiate association includes academic institutions in Worcester and other communities in Worcester County, such as Anna Maria College in neighboring Paxton. It facilitates cooperation among the colleges and universities. One example of this being its inter-college shuttle bus and student cross registration. Worcester is also the home of Dynamy, a "residential internship program" in the United States. The organization was founded in 1969. The city is also home to many trade schools such as the Peterson School, Porter and Chester Institute, the Fieldstone School, and the Rob Roy Academy, among others. Additionally, the Worcester Technical High School offers adult education classes.

Defunct Institutions
Becker College was a private college with campuses in Worcester and neighboring Leicester that closed at the end of the 2020–21 academic year. The college was formed in 1977 out of the merger of Leicester Junior College (Founded 1784 as Leicester Academy) and Becker Junior College (1887). In recent years, Becker's video game design program was consistently ranked in the top 10 in the U.S. and Canada. Clark University started an equivalent program, Becker School of Design & Technology, hiring the majority of the faculty from the original program at Becker College, and offering transfers to Becker students.

The Oread Institute was an early women's college that closed its doors in 1934. Founded in 1849 by Eli Thayer it counted among its graduates the founders of Spelman College.

Culture

 

Much of Worcester's culture is synonymous with broader New England culture. The city's name is notoriously mispronounced by people unfamiliar with the city. As with the city in England, the first syllable of "cester" (castra) is left entirely unvoiced. Combined with a traditionally non-rhotic Eastern New England English accent, the name can be transcribed as "WOOS-tuh" or "WISS-tuh" (the first syllable possibly having a near-close central unrounded vowel).

Worcester has many traditionally ethnic neighborhoods, including Quinsigamond Village (Swedish), Shrewsbury Street (Italian), Kelley Square (Irish and Polish), Vernon Hill (Lithuanian), Union Hill (Jewish), and Main South (Puerto Rican, Dominican, and Vietnamese).

Shrewsbury Street is Worcester's traditional "Little Italy" neighborhood and today boasts many of the city's most popular restaurants and nightlife. The Canal District was once an old Eastern European neighborhood, but has been redeveloped into a very popular bar, restaurant and club scene.
Worcester is also famously the former home of the Worcester Lunch Car Company. The company began in 1906 and built many famous lunch car diners in New England. Worcester is home to many classic lunch car diners including Boulevard Diner, Corner Lunch, Chadwick Square Diner, and Miss Worcester Diner.

There are also many dedicated community organizations and art associations in the city. stART on the Street is an annual festival promoting local art. The Worcester Music Festival and New England Metal and Hardcore Festival are also held annually in Worcester. The Worcester County St. Patrick's Parade runs through Worcester and is one of the largest St. Patrick's Day celebrations in the state. The city also hosts the second oldest First Night celebration in the country each New Year's Eve. Since 1916, Worcester has also been the home of the Worcester Kiltie Pipe Band, one of the oldest pipe bands in the United States.

Worcester is also the state's largest center for the arts outside of Boston. Mechanics Hall, built in 1857, is one of the oldest concert halls in the country and is renowned for its pure acoustics. In 2008 the old Poli Palace Theatre reopened as the Hanover Theatre for the Performing Arts.  The theatre brings many Broadway shows and nationally recognized performers to the city. Tuckerman Hall, designed by one of the country's earliest woman architects, Josephine Wright Chapman, is home to the Massachusetts Symphony Orchestra.  The DCU Center arena and convention holds many large concerts, exhibitions and conventions in the city.  The Worcester County Poetry Association sponsors readings by national and local poets in the city and the Worcester Center for Crafts provides craft education and skills to the community. Worcester is also home to the Worcester Youth Orchestras. Founded in 1947 by Harry Levenson, it is the 3rd oldest youth orchestra in the country and regularly performs at Mechanics Hall. 

Mechanics Hall is also home to the Worcester Symphony Orchestra formerly known as the New England Symphony Orchestra.<ref>{{cite web|url=https://telegram.com/story/entertainment/2022/04/01/new-england-symphony-orchestra-from-new-world-mechanics-hall/7132508001/|title=New England Symphony Orchestra 'From the 'New World in Mechanics Hall}}</ref> Founded in 1974 the Worcester Symphony Orchestra performs classical works regularly at Mechanics Hall in downtown Worcester.

The nickname Wormtown is synonymous with the city's once large underground rock music scene. The nickname has now become used to refer to the city itself.

Due to its location in Central Massachusetts, Worcester is known as the "Heart of the Commonwealth;" a heart is the official symbol of the city. However, the heart symbol may also have its provenance in lore that the Valentine's Day card, although not invented in the city, was first mass-produced and popularized by Worcester resident Esther Howland. Similarly, the invention of the classic yellow "smiley face" design by Worcester native Harvey Ball has gained it an iconic status in the city. This design is now commonly seen in art and merchandise relating to Worcester, including murals, t-shirts and stickers.

Sites of interest

Worcester has 1,200 acres of publicly owned property. Notable parks include Elm Park, which was laid out by Frederick Law Olmsted in 1854, and the City Common laid out in 1669. Both parks are listed on the National Register of Historic Places.  The largest park in the city is the 549 acre Green Hill Park. The park was donated by the Green family in 1903 and includes the Green Hill Park Shelter built in 1910. In 2002, the Massachusetts Vietnam Veterans Memorial was dedicated in Green Hill Park. Other Parks, include Newton Hill, East Park, Morgan Park, Shore Park, Crompton Park, Hadwen Park, Institute Park and University Park. Though not within city limits, Tower Hill Botanical Garden is operated by the Worcester County Horticultural Society and is a 20-minute drive northeast of the city in Boylston. The Horticultural Society's former headquarters is now the Worcester Historical Museum, dedicated to the cultural, economic, and scientific contributions of the city to American society. As a former manufacturing center, Worcester has many historic 19th century buildings and on the National Register of Historic Places, including the old facilities of the Crompton Loom Works, Ashworth and Jones Factory and Worcester Corset Company Factory.

The American Antiquarian Society has been in Worcester since 1812. The national library and society has one of the largest collections of early American history in the world. The city's main museum is the Worcester Art Museum established in 1898. The museum is the second largest art museum in New England, behind the Museum of Fine Arts in Boston.   From 1931 to 2013, Worcester was home to the Higgins Armory Museum, which was the sole museum dedicated to arms and armor in the country. Its collection and endowment were transferred and integrated into the Worcester Art Museum, with the collection now being shown in a new gallery which opened in 2015. The non-profit Veterans Inc. is headquartered at the southern tip of Grove Street in the historic Massachusetts National Guard Armory building.

The Worcester Memorial Auditorium is one of the most prominent buildings in the city.  Built as a World War I war memorial in 1933, the multipurpose auditorium has hosted many of the Worcester's most famous concerts and sporting events, and is undergoing a renovation to become a multi media Center and digital arts auditorium, and event Center.

Sports

Since 2021, Worcester has been the home of the Worcester Red Sox, the Triple-A affiliate of the Boston Red Sox. They play their home games at the newly constructed Polar Park.

Worcester was home to Marshall Walter ("Major") Taylor, an African American cyclist who won the world one-mile (1.6 km) track cycling championship in 1899. Taylor's legacy includes being the first African American and the second black athlete to be a world champion (Canadian boxer George Dixon, 1892). Taylor was nicknamed the Worcester Whirlwind by the local papers.

Lake Quinsigamond is home to the Eastern Sprints, a premier rowing event in the United States. Competitive rowing teams first came to Lake Quinsigamond in 1857. Finding the long, narrow lake ideal for such crew meets, avid rowers established boating clubs on the lake's shores, the first being the Quinsigamond Boating Club. More boating clubs and races followed, and soon many colleges (local, national, and international) held regattas, such as the Eastern Sprints, on the lake. Beginning in 1895, local high schools held crew races on the lake. In 1952, the lake played host to the National Olympic rowing trials.

In 2002, the Jesse Burkett Little League all-stars team went all the way to the Little League World Series. They made it to the US final before losing to Owensboro, Kentucky. Jesse Burkett covers the West Side area of Worcester, along with Ted Williams Little League.

The city hosts the Worcester Railers of the ECHL, which began play in October 2017. Prior to the Railers, the American Hockey League team Worcester Sharks played in Worcester from 2006 to 2015, before relocating to San Jose. The Sharks played at the DCU Center as a developmental team for the National Hockey League's San Jose Sharks. The AHL was formerly represented by the Worcester IceCats from 1994 to 2005. The IceCats were chiefly affiliated with the St. Louis Blues. The city hosted the Worcester Blades of the Canadian Women's Hockey League (CWHL) for one season, playing their 2018–19 home games in the Fidelity Bank Worcester Ice Center for that league's final season.

Worcester now hosts the Massachusetts Pirates, an indoor football team in the Indoor Football League (where they are the defending United Bowl champions, which started in 2018 at the DCU Center.  The city previously was home to the New England Surge of the defunct Continental Indoor Football League.

The city's former professional baseball team, the Worcester Tornadoes, started in 2005 and was a member of the Canadian-American Association of Professional Baseball League. The team played at the Hanover Insurance Park at Fitton Field on the campus of the College of the Holy Cross and was not affiliated with any major league team. The Tornadoes won the 2005 Can-Am League title. The team's owner ran into financial difficulties, and the team disbanded after the 2012 season. The Worcester Bravehearts began play in 2014 as the local affiliate of the Futures Collegiate Baseball League, and won the league championship in their inaugural season.

Candlepin bowling was invented in Worcester in 1880 by Justin White, an area bowling alley owner. The Worcester County Wildcats, part of the New England Football League, is a semi-pro football team, and play at Commerce Bank Field at Foley Stadium.

Golf's Ryder Cup's first official tournament was played at the Worcester Country Club in 1927. The course also hosted the U.S. Open in 1925, and the U.S. Women's Open in 1960.

Worcester's colleges have long histories and many notable achievements in collegiate sports. The College of the Holy Cross represents NCAA Division 1 sports in Worcester. The other colleges and Universities in Worcester correspond with division II and III. The Holy Cross Crusaders won the NCAA men's basketball champions in 1947 and NIT men's basketball champions in 1954, led by future NBA hall-of-famers and Boston Celtic legends Bob Cousy and Tom Heinsohn.

Religion

According to the U.S. Religion Census 2010, most inhabitants of Worcester County report no religious affiliation. Following None, the largest reported religious denomination is Catholicism. The first Catholics came to Worcester in 1826. They were chiefly Irish immigrants brought to America by the builders of the Blackstone canal. As time went on and the number of Catholics increased, the community petitioned Bishop Fenwick to send them a priest. In response to this appeal, the bishop appointed the Reverend James Fitton to visit the Catholics of Worcester in 1834. A Catholic Mass was first offered in the city in an old stone building on Front Street. The foundation of Christ's Church, the first Catholic church in Worcester (now St. John's), was laid on July 6, 1834. The Roman Catholic Diocese of Worcester was canonically erected on January 14, 1950, by Pope Pius XII. Its territories were taken from the neighboring Diocese of Springfield. The fifth and current bishop is Robert Joseph McManus.

The Unitarian-Universalist Church of Worcester was founded in 1841.
Worcester's Greek Orthodox Cathedral, St. Spyridon, was founded in 1924.

Worcester is home to a dedicated Jewish population who attend five synagogues, including Reform congregation Temple Emanuel Sinai, Congregation Beth Israel, a Conservative synagogue founded in 1924, and Orthodox Congregation Tifereth Israel – Sons of Jacob (Chabad), home of Yeshiva Achei Tmimim Academy. Beth Israel and its rabbi were the subject of the book And They Shall be My People: An American Rabbi and His Congregation by Paul Wilkes.

The first Armenian Church in the Western Hemisphere was built in Worcester in 1890 and consecrated on January 18, 1891, as "Soorp Purgich" (Holy Savior). The current sanctuary of the congregation, now known as Armenian Church of Our Savior, was consecrated in 1952.

Worcester is home to America's largest community of Mandaeans, numbering around 2,500. Most Mandaeans in Worcester arrived as refugees from instability in Iraq during the early 21st century.

Media

The Telegram & Gazette is Worcester's only daily newspaper. The paper, known locally as "the Telegram" or "the T and G", is wholly owned by GateHouse Media of Fairport, New York.

The commonwealth's UniMás station, WUTF-TV, channel 27, is licensed to Worcester, but operates from Needham. The region's version of Spectrum News 1, which over the years has expanded from a community access channel to a regional cable news channel, is based in the community.

Radio stations based in Worcester include WCHC, WCUW, WSRS, WTAG, WWFX, WICN and WXLO. WCCA-TV shows on channel 194 and provides Community Cable-Access Television as well as a live stream of the channel on the station's website.

 Notable people 

 Infrastructure 

Transportation
Worcester is served by several interstate highways. Interstate 290 (I-290) connects central Worcester to I-495 in Marlboro, the Mass Pike and I-395 in nearby Auburn and the Connecticut city of Norwich. I-190 links Worcester to Route 2 and the cities of Fitchburg and Leominster in northern Worcester County. The Pike can also be reached via a connecting segment of Route 146 from Providence.

Worcester is also served by several smaller Massachusetts state highways. Route 9 links the city to its eastern and western suburbs, Shrewsbury and Leicester. Route 9 runs almost the entire length of the state, connecting Boston and Worcester with Pittsfield, near the New York state border. Route 12 was the primary route north to Leominster and Fitchburg until the completion of I-190. Route 12 also connected Worcester to Webster before I-395 was completed. It still serves as an alternative local route. Route 146, the Worcester-Providence Turnpike, connects the city with the similar city of Providence, Rhode Island. Route 20 touches the southernmost tip of Worcester near the Massachusetts Turnpike. Route 20 is a coast-to-coast route connecting the Atlantic to the Pacific Ocean, and is the longest road in the United States.

Worcester is the headquarters of the Providence and Worcester, a Class II railroad operating throughout much of southern New England. Worcester is also the western terminus of the Framingham/Worcester commuter rail line run by the Massachusetts Bay Transportation Authority. Union Station serves as the hub for commuter railway traffic. Built in 1911, the station has been restored to its original grace and splendor, reopening to full operation in 2000. It also serves as an Amtrak stop, serving the Lake Shore Limited from Boston to Chicago. In October 2008, the MBTA added 5 new trains to the Framingham/Worcester line as part of a plan to add 20 or more trains from Worcester to Boston and also to buy the track from CSX Transportation. Train passengers may also connect to additional services such as the Vermonter line in Springfield.

The Worcester Regional Transit Authority, or WRTA, manages the municipal bus system. Buses operate intracity as well as connect Worcester to surrounding central Massachusetts communities. Worcester is also served by OurBus, Peter Pan Bus Lines and Greyhound Bus Lines, which operate out of Union Station.

Worcester Regional Airport (KORH), owned and operated by Massport since 2010, lies at the top of Tatnuck Hill, Worcester's highest point. The airport was serviced by numerous airlines from the 1950s through the 1990s. After that, the airport encountered years of spotty commercial service, but it has since been given new life with the arrival of jetBlue, Delta Air Lines, and American Airlines.

Healthcare

In 1830, state legislation funded the creation of the Worcester State Insane Asylum Hospital (1833) and became one of the first new public asylums in the United States. Prior the Worcester State Insane Asylum hospital, all other treatment centers were funded by private philanthropists which neglected treatment for the poor.

Worcester is home to the University of Massachusetts Medical School, ranked fourth in primary care education among America's 125 medical schools in the 2006 U.S. News & World Report annual guide "America's Best Graduate Schools". The medical school is in the top quartile of medical schools nationally in research funding from the NIH and is home to highly respected scientists including a Nobel laureate, a Lasker Award recipient and multiple members of the National Academy of Sciences and the Howard Hughes Medical Institute. The school is closely affiliated with UMass Memorial Health Care, the clinical partner of the medical school, which has expanded its locations all over Central Massachusetts. St. Vincent Hospital at Worcester Medical Center in the downtown area rounds out Worcester's primary care facilities. Reliant Medical Group, formerly Fallon Clinic, is the largest private multi-specialty group in central Massachusetts with over 30 different specialties. It is affiliated with St. Vincent's Hospital in downtown Worcester. Reliant Medical Group was the creator of Fallon Community Health Plan, a now independent HMO based in Worcester, and one of the largest health maintenance organizations (HMOs) in the state.

Utilities and public services

Worcester has a municipally owned water supply. Its water filtration plant is located in Holden near two of the reservoirs. Sewage disposal services are provided by the Upper Blackstone Water Pollution Abatement District, which services Worcester as well as some surrounding communities.

National Grid USA is the exclusive distributor of electric power to the city, though due to deregulation, customers now have a choice of electric generation companies. Natural gas is distributed by NSTAR Gas; only commercial and industrial customers may choose an alternate natural gas supplier. Verizon, successor to New England Telephone, NYNEX, and Bell Atlantic, is the primary wired telephone service provider for the area. Phone service is also available from various national wireless companies. Cable television is available from Charter Communications, with broadband Internet access also provided, while a variety of DSL providers and resellers are able to provide broadband Internet over Verizon-owned phone lines.

Sister cities

Worcester has the following sister cities:
  Worcester, United Kingdom (1998)
  Afula, Israel
  Piraeus, Greece (2005)
  Pushkin, Saint Petersburg, Russia (1987)

See also

 Greater Worcester Land Trust
 List of mill towns in Massachusetts
 List of people from Worcester, Massachusetts
 List of tallest buildings in Worcester, Massachusetts
 McCullen v. Coakley Worcester Public Library
 National Register of Historic Places listings in Worcester, Massachusetts
 USS Worcester, 3 ships

Notes

References

Further reading

 Dubay, Debby (2014). Worcester, Massachusetts: "The Heart of the Commonwealth." Atglen, PA: Schiffer, Publishing.
 
 
 
 
 Wall & Gray. 1871 Atlas of Massachusetts.
 
 
 "From Bondage to Belonging: The Worcester Slave Narratives", B. Eugene McCarthy & Thomas L. Doughton, editors.
 Map of Massachusetts. USA. New England. Counties – Berkshire, Franklin, Hampshire and Hampden, Worcester, Middlesex, Essex and Norfolk, Boston – Suffolk, Plymouth, Bristol, Barnstable and Dukes (Cape Cod). Cities – Springfield, Worcester, Lowell, Lawrence, Haverhill, Newburyport, Salem, Lynn, Taunton, Fall River. New Bedford. These 1871 maps of the Counties and Cities are useful to see the roads and rail lines.
 Beers, D.G. 1872 Atlas of Essex County'' Map of Massachusetts Plate 5. Click on the map for a very large image. Also see map of 1872 Essex County Plate 7.

External links

 
 
 Worcester Regional Chamber of Commerce

 
Cities in Massachusetts
Cities in Worcester County, Massachusetts
County seats in Massachusetts
Populated places established in 1673
1673 establishments in Massachusetts
Worcester, MA–CT metropolitan area